Pakistan Association for the Advancement of Science (PAAS) is a scientific organisation based in Pakistan. Headquartered in Lahore, the organisation was founded in December 1947 soon after the independence of Pakistan, and is among the oldest and premier science organisations in the country. Its aim is the promotion and development of science in the country, as well as to provide a forum for scientific meetings, and facilitate the publication of scientific research papers.

References

Further reading
 

1947 establishments in Pakistan
Organisations based in Lahore
Scientific societies based in Pakistan
Scientific organizations established in 1947
Members of the International Council for Science
Members of the International Science Council